This is a list of playback singers from India.

Female playback singers

Male playback singers

See also 

 Lists of Indian people
 Lists of musicians
 Bollywood content lists

References

Lists of Indian playback singers
Lists of women in music